Fr. Michael Kennedy is an Irish retired hurler who played as a full-back for the Offaly senior team.

Born in Birr, County Offaly, Kennedy first played competitive hurling in his youth. He made his senior debut with Offaly during the 1975 championship and immediately became a regular member of the team. During his career Kennedy won one Leinster medal. He also won an All-Ireland medal as a non-playing substitute.

At club level Kennedy played with Birr.

His retirement came following the conclusion of the 1981 championship.

Honours

Team

Offaly
All-Ireland Senior Hurling Championship (1): 1981 (sub)
Leinster Senior Hurling Championship (2): 1980, 1981 (sub)

References

Living people
Birr hurlers
Offaly inter-county hurlers
Year of birth missing (living people)